The Marriage Equality Caravan, or  Marriage Equality Express, was an educational bus tour organized by the California chapter of Marriage Equality USA, in response to the invalidation by the California Supreme Court, on August 11, 2004, of 4,000 same-sex marriages that had taken place between February 12 and March 11 of that year. The tour was led by Davina Kotulski, Molly McKay, Belinda Ryan, Wendy Daw, Jacqueline Frank, and Bev Senkowski.

Tour
On October 4, 2004, 44 activists including Kotulski, McKay, California marriage case plaintiffs Stuart Gaffney and John Lewis, Roland Torres Q TV, Karen Ocamb, Out Word, Mike Kepka and Rona Marech, a photographer and reporter for the San Francisco Chronicle, and Unitarian Universalist ministers Helen Carroll and John Millspaugh, left California and traveled across the country, stopping in 13 states and hosting same-sex marriage forums and panels at universities and churches. The trip culminated in the first national same-sex marriage rally in Washington, DC, on October 11, 2004, National Coming Out Day. The rally featured the Hawaii Marriage Case Plaintiff Genora Dancel; Beth Robinson, attorney in the Vermont Freedom to Marry case; Reverend Jimmy Creech, a Methodist minister who was defrocked for marrying same-sex couples and leader of Soulforce; Dr. Sylvia Rhue of the National Black Justice Coalition; Robin Tyler, organizer for LGBT rights marches in Washington, DC, and founder of StopDr.Laura.com; Kathy Kelly of Marriage Equality Georgia; a performance from musicians Tuck and Patti; and politicians Mark Leno and Eleanor Holmes Norton. Marriage Equality Caravaners also told their stories.

Time and Parade magazines mentioned the rally when describing same-sex marriage activism as one of the top 10 issues of 2004.

References

External links
 Marriage Equality Caravan Photo Gallery, SFGate
 Radio Netherlands` Love Exile on the Road, a radio program about the Marriage Equality Express and the story of Americans who had to leave the United States to be with their same-sex foreign partners 
 October 6, 2004 "Battle Over Same-Sex Marriage: Tales from the road of gay rights caravan Marriage advocates share their stories as they head to D.C." BATTLE OVER SAME-SEX MARRIAGE / Tales from the road of gay rights caravan / Marriage advocates share their stories as they head to D.C.
 October 7, 2004 "A Grim Anniversary" BATTLE OVER SAME-SEX MARRIAGE / Gay activists mark a grim anniversary / Brutal 1998 slaying left legacy of pain and hope in Laramie
 October 8, 2004 "Tension Grips Caravan" BATTLE OVER SAME-SEX MARRIAGE / Tension grips gay rights caravan
 October 9, 2004 "Freedom Riders Loaded with Tech" Freedom riders loaded with tech
 October 10, 2004 "Marriage rights caravan gets lots of 'no thanks' from gays along road." Marriage rights caravan gets lots of 'no thanks' from gays along road
 October 11, 2004 "Canvassing the nation for gay marriage rights: Activists visit hometowns en route to D.C. rally today" BATTLE OVER SAME-SEX MARRIAGE / Canvassing the nation for gay marriage rights / Activists visit home towns en route to D.C. rally today
 October 12, 2004 "Marriage equality caravan joins spirited rally in D.C.: Tired but happy, couples renew vows" Marriage equality caravan joins spirited rally in D.C. / Tired but happy, couples renew vows

Activists from California
Same-sex marriage in the United States